Dolly Golden (born 28 August 1973) is a former pornographic actress.

Career
She was born in Annecy, Haute-Savoie, France and received an award for Best European Starlet in Brussels in 1997. She appeared in productions in Germany, Italy, Holland, Spain and the United States, where the media became interested in her and she appeared on several television shows.

She appeared in many articles and adult press covers. Passionate about dance, she performed erotic dance shows in French discothèques. She has appeared in several music video clips.

She was the godmother of the Paris Hot Vidéo Exhibition, held in February 2000. She has been nominated about 50 times at various award ceremonies around the world, including Berlin, Milan, Barcelona, and Las Vegas.
In Cannes, in 1999, she won the Hot d' Or for Best European Actress – Supporting Role, for film "Croupe du Monde 98 ". In 2000, she won the Hot d' Or for Best French Actress for "Les Tontons Tringleurs".

In 2000, along with her pornstar companion Marc Barrow, she produced and directed her first motion picture for an American company. Golden no longer appears in adult movies, and now does public relations work for Dorcel Films.

Filmography
 1999 : Angel’s Quest
 2005 : L'Ex-femme de ma vie, directed by Josiane Balasko

References

External links 
 
 
 
 

1973 births
Living people
French pornographic film actresses
People from Annecy